"Nothing Ever Hurt Like You" is a song written by James Morrison, teaming up with Paul Barry and Mark Taylor. The single, released in the U.S. only on 2008, is listed on his second major studio album Songs for You, Truths for Me, which has been available for U.K. purchase since 29 September via Polydor.
The song enjoyed modest success in the U.S. thanks to AAA Radio, in which the song remained in the Top 20 for most of 2009, peaking at number 1 on the chart.
The song was released as the UK fourth single from the album in July.

Music video
A music video in support of James Morrison's "Nothing Ever Hurt Like You" made its world premiere on 15 November 2008. The video features him performing the new track with his band in a studio with huge lamps illuminating the room from the background.

Charts

Weekly charts

Year-end charts

References

2008 singles
2009 singles
James Morrison (singer) songs
Songs written by James Morrison (singer)
Songs written by Mark Taylor (record producer)
Songs written by Paul Barry (songwriter)
Song recordings produced by Mark Taylor (record producer)
2008 songs